Allegro is a Polish online e-commerce platform.

It is managed by Allegro Sp. z o.o. (former: Allegro Group Sp.z o.o., Allegro.pl Sp. z o.o.) which was formed in 1999 and subsequently purchased by online auction site QXL Ricardo plc in March 2000. 
QXL Ricardo plc changed its name to Tradus plc in 2007, and was acquired by Naspers in 2008.
In October 2016, Naspers sold the Allegro Group to an alliance of investor funds: Cinven, Permira and Mid Europa Partners.

Immensely popular in Poland, Allegro was ranked 251st among the world's most used online websites by Alexa Internet, and was ranked 5th within Poland.

In 2011, Allegro claimed to have over 11 million users.
In 2017, Allegro claimed to have over 16 million users and more than 20 million accounts.

In 2021 Allegro bought Mimovrste, Slovenia’s largest online retailer.

In 2022 Allegro bought Mall Group, Czech online retailer.

Sales volume 
According to company data, 70 million items are sold through the Allegro platform monthly.

2016 Christmas ad 
Allegro's 3 minute 2016 Christmas advertisement featured an elderly Polish man teaching himself English in order to communicate with the granddaughter he is about to meet for the first time when he visits his son in London for Christmas. It was highly praised on social media and has been viewed over 15 million times on YouTube.

Against racism 

Since 2018 Allegro has cooperated with the Polish anti-racist organization the “Never Again” Association to remove auctions of newly manufactured items with racist, fascist and antisemitic content. In 2018-2019 more than 3500 items with fascist and antisemitic content were removed through this cooperation. These included numerous copies of contemporary editions of Hitler's “Mein Kampf” without critical commentary as well as books by David Irving, Leon Degrelle and Hennecke Kardel. The items offered for sale reported by “Never Again” included also newly made Third Reich flags and SS uniforms, signet rings and badges with Nazi swastikas, contemporary imitations of Nazi military decorations, records with Nazi music, lighters with an image of Hitler, or pendants with Mussolini.

References

External links 
Brand Journal

Online retailers of Poland
Companies based in Poznań
Retail companies established in 1999
Internet properties established in 1999
Polish brands
1999 establishments in Poland
Polish websites